Hans Weiss (8 October 1910 – 17 December 1985) was a German racing cyclist. He rode in the 1936 Tour de France.

References

External links
 

1910 births
1985 deaths
German male cyclists
Place of birth missing
Cyclists from Berlin